Lucky Town is the tenth studio album by American singer-songwriter Bruce Springsteen. The album was released on March 31, 1992, the same day as Springsteen's Human Touch album. Lucky Town peaked at number three on the Billboard 200, with "Better Days" (paired with Human Touchs title track) peaking at number one on the Mainstream Rock  and number 16 on the Billboard Hot 100. Lucky Town has since sold more than one million copies in the United States.

Background
Springsteen was working on Human Touch, which he intended to release sometime in 1990, but the project took him longer than he thought. He shelved the project in early 1991 and came back to it in September of the same year.  Intending to record one more song for the album ("Living Proof"), he ended up with 10 new songs, which became Lucky Town. Once he completed Lucky Town, he decided to release both albums at the same time. While most of the songs from the album have received few performances since the reunion of the E Street Band, "If I Should Fall Behind" was played at every show during the 1999–2000 Reunion Tour and was included in the Live in New York City DVD and CD release.

Themes
Compared to Human Touch, Lucky Town has a more stripped down, folk-based sound and is more personal in its songs' lyrics. Human Touch consisted of mostly love songs, while Lucky Town focuses on more specific events in Springsteen's life. The opening track "Better Days" expresses his desire to start over after some rough patches in his life (his divorce from his first wife). "Living Proof" is about the birth of his first son and "Local Hero" is about a time that he saw a picture of himself in a store window. When he went to buy it, the clerk told him it was a picture of a "local hero." "Souls of the Departed" recalls "Born in the U.S.A." in its sound and social commentary.  The song was inspired by the Gulf War.

Critical reception

Upon release the album received generally positive reviews. Rolling Stone gave the album a positive review (a combined review with its companion album, Human Touch), but thought that the aims of the two albums "would have been better realized by a single, more carefully shaped collection." In a mostly positive review, AllMusic said of the album: "While Human Touch was a disappointing album of second-rate material, Lucky Town is an ambitious collection addressing many of Springsteen's major concerns and moving them forward."

Robert Christgau of The Village Voice called it a "ponderous, well-crafted disappointment, a shorter and by most accounts lighter piece of work than its more songful corelease Human Touch." Bill Wyman of The Chicago Reader compared it favorably to Human Touch, calling Lucky Town "obviously the superior work" and "a much more interesting beast, primarily because of the potency of the first three numbers [which] could have made a respectable anchor to a strong album." However, he added that "the record's illegitimate beginnings soon take their toll, and formula returns to the fore...What themes there are on the record - a sort of Catholic wonder and love of life alternating with the usual fears and worries of the characters in Springsteen's ongoing New Jersey gothic - never come alive." Greg Kot of The Chicago Tribune later wrote that Lucky Town was "highly underrated...containing some of the strongest songwriting of Springsteen's career and ranks as one of his most completely realized albums."

In The Village Voices annual Pazz & Jop critics poll for the year's best albums, Lucky Town placed at number 17 in the voting, way ahead of Human Touch which finished at number 80.

Track listing
All songs are written by Bruce Springsteen.

Unreleased outtakes
Eleven songs were written during these sessions with the song "Happy" being the only outtake and eventually released on the Tracks box set.

Personnel
 Bruce Springsteen – guitar, lead vocals, keyboards, bass guitar, harmonica, percussion
Additional Musicians
 Gary Mallaber – drums
 Roy Bittan – keyboards on "Leap of Faith", "The Big Muddy" and "Living Proof"
 Patti Scialfa – backing vocals on "Better Days", "Local Hero" and "Leap of Faith"
 Soozie Tyrell – backing vocals on "Better Days", "Local Hero" and "Leap of Faith"
 Lisa Lowell – backing vocals on "Better Days", "Local Hero" and "Leap of Faith"
 Randy Jackson – bass guitar on "Better Days"
 Ian McLagan – Hammond organ on "My Beautiful Reward"
Technical

 Bruce Springsteen, Jon Landau, Chuck Plotkin – production
 Roy Bittan – additional production on "Leap of Faith", "The Big Muddy" and "Living Proof"
 Toby Scott – engineering
Greg Goldman, Robert "RJ" Jaczko, Randy Wine – assistant engineering
Bob Clearmountain – mixing
Bob Ludwig – mastering
Scott Hull, Dave Collins – digital editing
Sandra Choron – art direction
Victor Weaver – typography design
David Rose – cover photography, interior photography
Pam Springsteen – interior photography

Charts

Weekly charts

Year-end charts

Certifications

Notes

References

External links
 
 Album audio and lyrics

1992 albums
Bruce Springsteen albums
Albums produced by Jon Landau
Albums produced by Chuck Plotkin
Columbia Records albums
Albums recorded at A&M Studios
Albums recorded in a home studio